In probability and statistics, the truncated normal distribution is the probability distribution derived from that of a normally distributed random variable by bounding the random variable from either below or above (or both). The truncated normal distribution has wide applications in statistics and econometrics.

Definitions

Suppose  has a normal distribution with mean  and variance  and lies within the interval . Then  conditional on  has a truncated normal distribution.

and by  otherwise.

Here,

 
By definition, if , then , and similarly, if , then .

The above formulae show that when  the scale parameter  of the truncated normal distribution is allowed to assume negative values. The parameter  is in this case imaginary, but the function  is nevertheless real, positive, and normalizable. The scale parameter  of the untruncated normal distribution must be positive because the distribution would not be normalizable otherwise. The doubly truncated normal distribution, on the other hand, can in principle have a negative scale parameter (which is different from the variance, see summary formulae), because no such integrability problems arise on a bounded domain.

Properties

The truncated normal is the maximum entropy probability distribution for a fixed mean and variance, with the random variate X constrained to be in the interval [a,b]. Truncated normals with fixed support form an exponential family.
Nielsen  reported closed-form formula for calculating the Kullback-Leibler divergence and the Bhattacharyya distance between two truncated normal distributions with the support of the first 
distribution nested into the support of the second distribution.

Moments

If the random variable has been truncated only from below, some probability mass has been shifted to higher values, giving a first-order stochastically dominating distribution and hence increasing the mean to a value higher than the mean  of the original normal distribution. Likewise, if the random variable has been truncated only from above, the truncated distribution has a mean less than 

Regardless of whether the random variable is bounded above, below, or both, the truncation is a mean-preserving contraction combined with a mean-changing rigid shift, and hence the variance of the truncated distribution is less than the variance  of the original normal distribution.

Two sided truncation 

Then:

and

Care must be taken in the numerical evaluation of these formulas, which can result in catastrophic cancellation when the interval  does not include . There are better ways to rewrite them that avoid this issue.

One sided truncation (of lower tail) 
In this case  then

and

where

One sided truncation (of upper tail) 
In this case  then

, 

Barr and Sherrill (1999) give a simpler expression for the variance of one sided truncations. Their formula is in terms of the chi-square CDF, which is implemented in standard software libraries.  Bebu and Mathew (2009) provide formulas for (generalized) confidence intervals around the truncated moments.

A recursive formula

As for the non-truncated case, there is a recursive formula for the truncated moments.

Multivariate

Computing the moments of a multivariate truncated normal is harder.

Generating values from the truncated normal distribution

A random variate  defined as
 
This is simply the inverse transform method for simulating random variables. Although one of the simplest, this method can either fail
when sampling in the tail of the normal distribution, or be much too slow. Thus, in  practice, one has to find alternative methods of simulation.

One such truncated normal generator (implemented in Matlab and
in R (programming language) as trandn.R  ) is based on an acceptance rejection idea due to Marsaglia. Despite the slightly suboptimal acceptance rate of Marsaglia (1964) in comparison with Robert (1995),  Marsaglia's method is typically  faster, because it does not require the costly numerical evaluation of the exponential function.    
    
For more on simulating a draw from the truncated normal distribution, see Robert (1995), Lynch (2007) Section 8.1.3 (pages 200–206), Devroye (1986).  The MSM package in R has a function, rtnorm, that calculates draws from a truncated normal.  The truncnorm package in R also has functions to draw from a truncated normal.

Chopin (2011) proposed (arXiv) an algorithm inspired from the Ziggurat algorithm of Marsaglia and Tsang (1984, 2000), which is usually considered as the fastest Gaussian sampler, and is also very close to Ahrens’s algorithm (1995). Implementations can be found in C, C++, Matlab and Python.

Sampling from the multivariate truncated normal distribution 
is considerably more difficult. Exact or perfect simulation is only feasible in the case of 
truncation of the normal distribution to a polytope region. 
 In  more general cases, Damien and Walker (2001) introduce a general methodology for sampling truncated densities within a Gibbs sampling framework. Their algorithm introduces one latent variable and, within a Gibbs sampling framework, it is more computationally efficient than the algorithm of Robert (1995).

See also 
 Folded normal distribution
 Half-normal distribution
 Normal distribution
 Rectified Gaussian distribution
 Truncated distribution
 PERT distribution

Notes

References
 
 
 Norman L. Johnson and Samuel Kotz (1970). Continuous univariate distributions-1, chapter 13. John Wiley & Sons.
 
 
 
 
 
 Nicolas Chopin, "Fast simulation of truncated Gaussian distributions". Statistics and Computing 21(2): 275-288, 2011, doi:10.1007/s11222-009-9168-1
 

Continuous distributions
Normal distribution

fr:Loi tronquée#Loi normale tronquée